The International Day to End Impunity for Crimes against Journalists (IDEI) is a UN-recognized international day observed annually on 2 November.

The day draws attention to the level of impunity for crimes against journalists, which remains extremely high globally. Between 2006 and 2020, over 1,200 journalists have been killed around the world, with close to 9 out of 10 cases of these killings remaining judicially unresolved, according to the UNESCO observatory of killed journalists. As journalists play a critical role in reporting facts to all citizens, impunity for attacks against them has a particularly damaging impact, limiting public awareness and constructive debate.

On 2 November, organizations and individuals worldwide are encouraged to talk about the unresolved cases in their countries, and write to government and intra-governmental officials to demand action and justice. UNESCO organizes an awareness-raising campaign on the findings of the UNESCO Director-General's biennial Report on the Safety of Journalists and the Danger of Impunity, which catalogues the responses of states to UNESCO's formal request for updates on progress in cases of killings of journalists and media workers. UNESCO and civil society groups throughout the world also use 2 November as a launch date for other reports, events and other advocacy initiatives relating to the problem of impunity for crimes against freedom of expression.

History
International Freedom of Expression Exchange (IFEX), a global network of civil society organizations that defend and promote the right to freedom of expression, declared 23 November as the International Day to End Impunity in 2011. The anniversary was chosen to mark the 2009 Ampatuan massacre (also known as the Maguindanao massacre), the single deadliest attack against journalists in recent history, in which 57 individuals were murdered, including 32 journalists and media workers.

In December 2013, after substantial lobbying from IFEX members and other civil society defenders of freedom of expression, the 70th plenary meeting of the UN General Assembly passed resolution 68/163, recognizing 2 November as the International Day to End Impunity for Crimes against Journalists (IDEI). The date of the UN day marks the death of Ghislaine Dupont and Claude Verlon, two French journalists killed while reporting in Mali earlier that year.

IFEX now coordinates the No Impunity Campaign, which advocates year-round for all individuals violently targeted for their free expression.

Since 2013, global commemorations of the IDEI continue to serve as a unique opportunity to sensitize and promote a constructive dialogue among all actors involved in fighting impunity for crimes against journalists and media professionals.

See also
Freedom of the press
Impunity
World Press Freedom Day
Safety of journalists

References

External links
The International Day to End Impunity for Crimes against Journalists (UN)
The International Day to End Impunity for Crimes against Journalists (UNESCO)
UN Plan of Action on the Safety of Journalists and the Issue of Impunity
UNESCO's work on the Safety of Journalists 
The No Impunity Campaign

November observances
Events relating to freedom of expression
United Nations days
Impunity